Constantin Meunier (12 April 1831 – 4 April 1905) was a Belgian painter and sculptor. He made an important contribution to the development of modern art by elevating the image of the industrial worker, docker and miner to an icon of modernity. His work is a reflection of the industrial, social and political developments of his day and represents a compassionate and committed view of man and the world.

Early life and education
Constantin Meunier was born in the traditionally working-class area of Etterbeek in Brussels.  His family was poor and suffered from the negative economic impact caused by the Belgian Revolution which had taken place the year before Meunier's birth.  Meunier's father committed suicide when he was just four years old.

He began studying sculpture at the age of 14 at the Academy of Fine Arts in Brussels in September 1845. He studied under the sculptor Louis Jehotte (1804–84) from 1848. He also attended from 1852 the private studio of the sculptor Charles-Auguste Fraikin. While he encountered modestly success as a sculptor, his encounter with Gustave Courbet's social realist painting The Stone Breakers in 1851 caused him to doubt the ability of sculpture to adequate represent the contemporary social and artistic issues that were of concern to him. He therefore gave up sculpture in favour of painting which he practised almost exclusively for the next thirty years.

Career

Meunier's first exhibit was a plaster sketch, The Garland, shown at the Brussels Salon in 1851. His first important painting, The Salle St Roch (1857), was followed by a series of paintings including A Trappist Funeral (1860), Trappists Ploughing (1863), in collaboration with Alfred Verwee, Divine Service at the Monastery of La Trappe (1871) and episodes of the German Peasants' War (1878), as well as of Belgium's own historical Peasants' War.

About 1880 Meunier was commissioned to illustrate those parts of Camille Lemonnier's description of Belgium in Le Tour du monde which referred to miners and factory-workers, and produced In the Factory, Smithery at Cockerill's, Melting Steel at the Factory at Seraing (1882), Returning from the Pit, and The Broken Crucible (1884).

In 1882 he was employed by the government to copy Pedro de Campaña's Descent from the Cross at Seville, and in Spain he painted such characteristic pictures as The Café Concert, Procession on Good Friday, and The Tobacco Factory at Seville (Brussels Gallery). On his return to Belgium he was appointed professor at the Louvain Academy of Fine Arts.

In 1885 he returned to sculpture and produced The Puddler, The Hammerman (1886), Firedamp (1889, Brussels Gallery), Le Débardeur (modeled 1885; many castings made 1889–1905), Ecce Homo (1891), The Old Mine-Horse (1891), The Mower (1892), The Glebe (1892), the monument to Father Damien at Louvain (1893), Puddler at the Furnace (1893), the scheme of decoration for the Botanical Garden of Brussels in collaboration with the sculptor Charles van der Stappen (1893), The Horse at the Pond, in the square in the north-east quarter of Brussels, and two unfinished works, the Monument to Labour and the Émile Zola monument, in collaboration with the French sculptor Alexandre Charpentier.

The Monument to Labour, which was acquired by the State for the Brussels Gallery, comprises four stone bas-reliefs: Industry, The Mine, Harvest, and the Harbour; four bronze statues: The Sower, The Smith, The Miner, and the Ancestor; and a bronze group, Maternity.

He was one of the co-founders of the Société Libre des Beaux-Arts of Brussels and was a member of the International Society of Sculptors, Painters and Gravers.

Meunier was a freemason and a member of the lodge Les Amis Philanthropes of the Grand Orient of Belgium in Brussels.

Meunier died in Ixelles on 4 April 1905.

Works by Constantin Meunier

Museum collections
In 1939, the Musée Constantin-Meunier dedicated to his work was opened in the last house in which Meunier lived and worked, in Ixelles, Brussels. Today about 150 of his works are displayed there. M - Museum Leuven also holds a number of important works by Meunier, as does Brussels' Fin-de-Siècle Museum.

See also
 Saemann (Meunier)

References

Sources
 
 P. & V. Berko, "Dictionary of Belgian painters born between 1750 & 1875", Knokke 1981, pp. 466–467.

External links
 
 

1831 births
1905 deaths
Belgian sculptors
Burials at Ixelles Cemetery
People from Etterbeek
19th-century Belgian painters
19th-century Belgian male artists
Académie Royale des Beaux-Arts alumni